Amna Fayyaz (born 2 August 2002) is a Pakistani professional squash player. As of April 2022, she was ranked number 121 in the world. She won the 2019 Pakistan Squash Circuit I professional tournament. She also plays squash for Dickinson College in the United States of America.

References

2002 births
Living people
Pakistani female squash players
Racket sportspeople from Rawalpindi
South Asian Games silver medalists for Pakistan
South Asian Games medalists in squash
Squash players at the 2018 Asian Games